Kim Jung Gi (legally Kim Jung Ki;  ,; 7 February 1975 – 3 October 2022) was a South Korean illustrator, cartoonist, and manhwa artist. He was famous for his large, highly detailed illustrations, often drawn only from memory.

Biography 
Kim was born in 1975 in Goyang, a suburb of Seoul. He was inspired to begin drawing after viewing an illustration from Dr. Slump, a manga drawn by Akira Toriyama. In school, his teachers often chastised him for not paying attention, as he was busy doodling in his notes.

At the age of 19, he pursued a fine arts education at Dong-Eui University, located in Busan; until he studied here he had not learned the mathematical principles of perspective, something he had previously done by intuition. Kim also served in the Republic of Korea Army; in some interviews, he stated that his time in the army allowed him to build a strong visual memory of a wide array of weapons, vehicles and army situations which he was able to recall in his illustrations.

In 2001, he chose "Kim Jung Gi" as his "English name" over his legal name, Kim Jung Ki, because "Gi" was "more visually appealing."

When Kim began his career as an artist between the years 2000 and 2001, his works were primarily military-related. According to his official biography, his first published work was Funny Funny, which ran in the Japanese magazine Young Jump between 2002 and 2003. Following this, he began teaching art at universities and private schools.  Kim worked for the art studio SuperAni and taught at the AniChanga Art School, which he co-founded with Kim Hyun-jin. He also taught at and provided video content for the Kazone Art Academy, a private secondary art school located in Los Angeles.

Kim frequently collaborated with other writers and illustrators. His first collaboration was with writer Seung-Jin Park, for whom he illustrated Tiger the Long Tail. Kim also collaborated more than once with Belgian comics artist Jean-David Morvan: in 2014 he provided the illustrations for Morvan's SpyGames comics, and in 2016 did the same for McCurry, NYC, 9/11. Besides these collaborations, Kim also provided illustrations for many other properties, including variant covers for Civil War II and 10th-anniversary illustrations for League of Legends. In 2017, Kim published Katsuya Terada + Kim Jung Gi Illustrations Collection, a collaboration between himself and one of his own favorite artists. He also claimed to have been working on a project with Katsuhiro Otomo.

Kim died in Paris of a heart attack on 3 October 2022, after experiencing chest pains.

Technique 

Kim was famous for his detailed illustrations, ink and brush artistic style, and skill at drawing from memory. He could complete his drawings entirely from his imagination, without the use of sketches, visual references, or other preparatory aids, and often used exotic forms of perspective, such as curvilinear perspective.

Kim drew in a variety of sizes, but he was especially well known for his large drawings. He drew these pictures directly on paper without the use of sketching or other preparation, improvising them as he went. From 2014, he also publicly exhibited his process at special events, where he would draw over a large white canvas. In 2015, he made an attempt to hold the Guinness world record for the "longest drawing by an individual."

Early in his career, Kim felt pressured to draw in the Japanese manga style, which was popular at the time. However, as tastes changed in South Korea, he managed to become well-known for his more realistic style.

Kim primarily drew in ink, and used a variety of pens from different manufacturers, including fineliners, brush pens, and simple ballpoint pens. When asked, he claimed that his skill came from his habit of constantly drawing, rather than his choice of pen; he also denied claims that he was an autistic savant. Kim was sponsored by Pentel.

Publications

Solo works

Collaborative works

Publications featuring illustrations by Kim
  (illustrations)
  (illustrations)
  (cover artwork)
  (variant covers)
  (cover artwork)

References

External links 
 , Europe
 , United States
 

1975 births
2022 deaths
South Korean artists
South Korean illustrators
South Korean manhwa artists
Dong-Eui University alumni
People from Goyang